Rotten Ralph is a series of children's picture books written by Jack Gantos and illustrated by Nicole Rubel. About twenty Rotten Ralph books have been published from 1976 to 2011. 
Rotten Ralph is also the first book in the series, a 32-page picture book published by Houghton Mifflin of Boston in 1976. It was the first published book for both Gantos and Rubel.

Alternatively, Rotten Ralph is the title character of the series, initially "a very very nasty cat" —a bright red domestic cat who enjoys playing mean, practical jokes on his human family.

There was a children's television series by  Cosgrove Hall Films, Tooncan Productions and Italtoons Corporation based on the books, first broadcast on CBBC from 1998 to 2001. It also went to air on Nickelodeon in the UK too, around 2000. The show hasn't been aired in the UK since reruns ended in 2005. The show aired in the United States on the Fox Family Channel from 1999 to 2001.

Books

All of the Rotten Ralph books have been written by Jack Gantos and illustrated by Nicole Rubel.

  Rotten Ralph (Houghton Mifflin, 1976) @  
  Worse than rotten, Ralph (H.M., 1978) @ 
  Rotten Ralph's rotten Christmas (H.M., 1984) @
  Rotten Ralph's trick or treat (H.M., 1986) @

  Rotten Ralph's show and tell (H.M., 1989) @
  Happy birthday Rotten Ralph (H.M., 1990) @
  Not so Rotten Ralph (H.M., 1994) @
  Rotten Ralph's rotten romance (H.M., 1997) @
 Back to school for Rotten Ralph (HarperCollins, 1998) @
 The Christmas spirit strikes Rotten Ralph (HC, 1998) 
 Rotten Ralph's Halloween Howl (HC, 1998) 
 Rotten Ralph's Thanksgiving wish (HC, 1999) 
 Wedding bells for Rotten Ralph (HC, 1999) 
 Rotten Ralph helps out (Farrar, Straus and Giroux, 2001) ‡
 Practice makes perfect for Rotten Ralph (Farrar, 2002) ‡
 Rotten Ralph feels rotten (Farrar, 2004) ‡
 Best in show for Rotten Ralph (Farrar, 2005) ‡
 The nine lives of Rotten Ralph (Houghton Mifflin, 2009) @
 Three strikes for Rotten Ralph (Farrar, 2011) ‡

 @ Rotten Ralph Picture Books listed by Gantos (10, nine published by Houghton) 
 ‡ Rotten Ralph Rotten Readers listed by Gantos (5, all published by Farrar)

This list of nineteen titles with publishers and publication dates is compiled from U.S. national library and WorldCat library catalog records.
According to a Horn Book Magazine review of The Nine Lives of Rotten Ralph in May 2009, the series had previously comprised "eight picture books (plus four early readers). This ninth volume flashes back to those marvelous stories and the unbridled antics therein, which, unfortunately for Ralph, shaved off eight of his lives." Eight Rotten Ralph books had then been published by Houghton Mifflin, all picture books; Nine Lives was the ninth. Four "rotten readers" had been published by Farrar, Straus and Giroux.

TV series

Cast
 Jennifer Seguin - Mom
 Mark Camacho - Dad
 Brigid Tierney - Sarah
 Rick Jones - Rotten Ralph
 Daniel Brochu - Cousin Percy
 Sonja Ball - Lulu / Grandma / Spirit / Kitten / Old Lady / Additional Voices
 Terrence Scammell - Fleabag / Bones / Ivan / Mr. Fred / TV Announcer / Josh / Clerk / Additional Voices
 Richard Dumont - TV Announcer / Bongo Bob / Manfred Moon / Buddy / Mailman / Additional Voices
 John Stocker - Station Manager / Additional Voices
 Jaclyn Linetsky - Brenda / Additional Voices
 A.J. Henderson - Buddy / Additional Voices
 Justin Bradley - Kid / Additional Voices
 Helena Evangeliou - Linda / Additional Voices
 Arthur Holden - TV Announcer / Additional Voices
 Eleanor Noble - Additional Voices
 Liz MacRae - Lala / Reporter / Additional Voices
 Harry Standjofski - Naughty Nathan
 Susan Glover - Madame Olga / Additional Voices
 NOTE: Terrence Scammell and Richard Dumont also direct the voices for the show whilst some of the episodes were voice directed by Chuck Rubin

Videocassettes

United States 
 Rotten Ralph volume 1 (20th Century Fox Home Entertainment, 1999)
 Rotten Ralph volume 2 (20th Century Fox Home Entertainment, 1999)

Episode list

See also

References

External links
 
 
 
 Nicole Rubel in WorldCat
 Rotten Ralph in WorldCat
 
 Rotten Ralph at the Big Cartoon DataBase

Series of children's books
American picture books
1976 children's books
Children's fiction books
Australian Broadcasting Corporation original programming
British television shows based on children's books
Canadian television shows based on children's books
1998 British television series debuts
2001 British television series endings
1998 Canadian television series debuts
2001 Canadian television series endings
1990s Canadian animated television series
2000s Canadian animated television series
Canadian children's animated television series
British stop-motion animated television series
Canadian stop-motion animated television series
BBC children's television shows
Disney Channel original programming
E.tv original programming
Fox Family Channel original programming
Nickelodeon original programming
TVNZ 2 original programming
Animated television series about cats
Television series by Cosgrove Hall Films
Television shows filmed in Montreal